is a passenger railway station in the city of Sakura, Chiba Prefecture, Japan, operated by the private railway operator Keisei Electric Railway.

Lines
Keisei Usui Station is served by the Keisei Main Line, and lies 45.7 kilometers from the Tokyo terminus of the line at Keisei-Ueno Station. Local, Rapid, and Commuter Express trains stop at this station. Some Commuter Express trains going towards Keisei Takasago Station in the weekday mornings have a dedicatedWomen-only passenger car in car 8. Most of the Local trains during daytime begin service from this station.

Station layout
Keisei Usui Station has two opposed elevated side platforms connected by underpasses to a station building underneath.

Platforms

History
Keisei Usui Station was opened on 9 December 1926. The station was rebuilt in October 1978, during which time it was physically relocated 580 meters towards Shizu Station. The shopping complex in the station building opened in 1996.

Station numbering was introduced to all Keisei Line stations on 17 July 2010. Keisei Usui Station was assigned station number KS34.

Buses

Highway buses

Passenger statistics
In fiscal 2019, the station was used by an average of 19,787 passengers daily.

Surrounding area
 Sakura City Usui Nishi Junior High School
 Sakura City Usui Elementary School

See also
 List of railway stations in Japan

References

External links

  Keisei Station layout 

Railway stations in Japan opened in 1926
Railway stations in Chiba Prefecture
Keisei Main Line
Sakura, Chiba